Dzhebariki-Khaya (Cabarıkı Xaya) is an urban locality (an urban-type settlement) in Tomponsky District of the Sakha Republic, Russia, located  from Khandyga, the administrative center of the district. As of the 2010 Census, its population was 1,694.

History
Urban-type settlement status was granted to it in 1974.

Administrative and municipal status
Within the framework of administrative divisions, the urban-type settlement of Dzhebariki-Khaya is incorporated within Tomponsky District as the Settlement of Dzhebariki-Khaya. As a municipal division, the Settlement of Dzhebariki-Khaya is incorporated within Tomponsky Municipal District as Dzhebariki-Khaya Urban Settlement.

References

Notes

Sources
Official website of the Sakha Republic. Registry of the Administrative-Territorial Divisions of the Sakha Republic. Tomponsky District. 

Urban-type settlements in the Sakha Republic